The Pic Sans Nom (3,913 m) (Nameless Peak) is a mountain in the Massif des Écrins in the French Alps. It lies in the middle of the steep mountain mass that runs south-west from Mont Pelvoux to the Ailefroide.

Its steep and extensive northern precipices are bounded by the Glacier Noir; its southern slopes, providing the only relatively easy means of access, are bounded by the Glacier du Coup de Sabre and the Glacier de Sialouze. The Pic du Coup de Sabre (3,699 m) to its south-west is considered part of the Pic Sans Nom.

See also

List of mountains of the Alps above 3000 m

References

External links
  Pic Sans Nom on SummitPost

Mountains of the Alps
Alpine three-thousanders
Mountains of Hautes-Alpes